Lactarius alachuanus is a member of the large genus Lactarius (order Russulales), known as milk-caps. Found in North America, the species was first described in 1938 by American mycologist William Alphonso Murrill. It is associated with oaks (Quercus spp.).

See also
 List of Lactarius species

References

alachuanus
Fungi of North America
Fungi described in 1938